RSIPV Auki is one of the Pacific Forum patrol boats Australia gave to the Royal Solomon Islands Police Force.

Background

Following the United Nations Convention on the Law of the Sea extending maritime nations' exclusive economic zones to  Australia agreed to design, build, and give twelve of its fellow members of the Pacific Forum with patrol vessels, so they could police and extend sovereignty to their exclusive economic zones using their own resources. Australia also helped build bases for the vessels, provide training, and help with maintenance.

Design

Australia designed the vessels to use commercial off-the-shelf equipment instead of cutting-edge, high-performance, military grade equipment, to ease the maintenance burden for their smaller neighbours.

Operational history

Auki helped provide aid to Vanuatu in 2015, after it was struck by a tropical cyclone.

Auki remained in service after her sister ship Lata was decommissioned on September 11, 2019.

Auki helped distribute ballot boxes in Vanuatu, in preparation for a general election, in March 2020.
Following detection of a tourist infected with the Covid-19 virus, in Vanuatu, Auki moored offshore of their opposite number's base, and prepared to begin a 14 day quarantine period, prior to returning to the Solomon Islands.

Replacement
RSIPV Auki was official decommissioned on March 4, 2021.

Australia is scheduled to replace Auki with the RSIPV Taro, a new, larger and more capable  in May 2021.

References

Naval ships of the Solomon Islands
Pacific Forum class patrol vessels
1991 ships